Ronald L. Greene (December 27, 1938 – March 31, 2021) was an American basketball coach who served as head coach of three Division I college basketball teams, as well as teams in Division II, the World Basketball League, the American Basketball Association, and high school.

Early career
Born in Terre Haute, Indiana, Greene was a high school star for the legendary Howard Sharpe at Terre Haute's Gerstmeyer Tech High.  He began his college career as a freshmen member of the Bradley Braves; he subsequently transferred to Murray State, completing his eligibility under Head Coach Cal Luther.  While at Murray, he received his Bachelor of Science degree in Health and Physical Education and was a member of Sigma Chi fraternity.  His coaching career began in 1965 at Loyola University New Orleans where he was an assistant coach under Head Coach Bill Gardiner. The team went 9–17 in his only season as an assistant before being promoted to the head coach position. He spent two seasons as Head Coach before moving across town to assume control of the University of New Orleans program.

University of New Orleans
Greene was hired by UNO when the school began intercollegiate varsity competition in 1969–70 season. He compiled a 149–64 (.700) record in eight seasons; leading the Privateers to a #1 final ranking for the 1970–71 season and a #2 final ranking for the 1974–75 season. Four of his teams qualified for NCAA tournaments. The Privateers finished fourth in 1974 Division II tourney and second in the 1975 tourney. Greene paved the way for the Privateers’ move to Division I in the 1975–76 season.

Mississippi State University
Greene only spent the 1977–1978 season with the Bulldogs. That year, the Bulldogs finished with an 18–9 record. Several hours after The Associated Press had named him the Southeastern Conference basketball coach of the year and the Mississippi state board had voted him a $7,500 raise, Greene announced he was leaving the job to become coach of his alma mater Murray State.

Murray State University
After managing only 4 wins in his first season in Murray, Greene coached the Racers to 23 wins the following year and an appearance in the National Invitation Tournament. The Racers knocked off Jacksonville and Alabama before losing to Illinois 65–63 in the Quarterfinals. Greene's Racers would reach the NIT twice more before he left in 1985. His overall record at Murray was 119–78. While at the Racer helm, Greene coached Racer greats, such as Gary Hooker and Lamont Sleets.

Indiana State University
Greene returned to his native Terre Haute in 1985 when he became head coach of the Indiana State Sycamores. Greene inherited a young team and finished 11–17 in his first season as head coach. The team, however never matched this success and Greene resigned after an abysmal 4–24 record in the 1988–89 season. His overall record at ISU was 31–82.

One of his players was Eddie Bird, the younger brother of NBA player Larry Bird.

Later career
Greene was head coach of the Nashville Stars during the 1991 WBL season. The Stars went 23–28 in their first and only season of existence. He resigned in July 1991 to become the 12th head coach at Calloway County High School. His tenure at Calloway County started rough, including a 16-game losing streak in his first season. Greene posted a few good seasons for the Lakers including a 23–6 season as well as two 17–9 seasons, spending 8 years at Calloway. He resigned following the 1999 season and former Murray State and Western Kentucky player Terry Birdsong took over. He returned to coaching in 2007 when he was named head coach of the ABA’s Kentucky Retros. In 2008 Greene was named head coach at Murray High School. He retired after the 2010–11 season.

Greene died on March 31, 2021 in Murray, Kentucky at age 82.

Head coaching record

References

1939 births
2021 deaths
American men's basketball coaches
American men's basketball players
Basketball coaches from Indiana
Basketball players from Indiana
College men's basketball head coaches in the United States
High school basketball coaches in Kentucky
Indiana State Sycamores men's basketball coaches
Loyola Wolf Pack men's basketball coaches
Mississippi State Bulldogs men's basketball coaches
Murray State Racers men's basketball coaches
Murray State Racers men's basketball players
New Orleans Privateers men's basketball coaches
Sportspeople from Terre Haute, Indiana